"She Don't Use Jelly" is a song by American rock band the Flaming Lips from their sixth studio album, Transmissions from the Satellite Heart (1993). It reached number 55 on the US Billboard Hot 100 and became a top-30 hit in Australia.

Music and lyrics
Discussing the song, the band's website states, "With its chiming pedal steel chorus breaks and seemingly nonsensical lyrics, the song entered into the realms of novelty hit. It's a happy little ditty about strange people and their individual idiosyncrasies, with pretty melodies laced throughout and punctuated by trademark moments of crunching but still harmonious noise."

The song describes a woman who "thinks of ghosts" and puts Vaseline on toast, a man who "goes to shows" and uses magazines to blow his nose, and another woman that "reminds [the narrator] of Cher" and uses tangerines to make her hair orange. Coyne has stated, "The song came to me very quickly, and I thought it was sort of funny."

Reception and legacy
"She Don't Use Jelly" became popular after being featured on the MTV show Beavis and Butt-head, nearly a year after the album's release. It is still their highest charting single to date (and the only to chart on the U.S. Billboard Hot 100), even entering the top 10 of the Modern Rock Tracks chart, at number 9. The song's success additionally garnered the band a guest spot on the TV show Beverly Hills, 90210, in which they played live at the show's hangout, The Peach Pit; afterwards,  supporting character Steve Sanders (portrayed by actor Ian Ziering) remarks, "You know, I've never been a big fan of alternative music, but these guys rocked the house!"

Even though the band often ignores playing their pre-Soft Bulletin material, "She Don't Use Jelly" has usually been the most notable exception and is still played live at most of their concerts to this day. It usually is preceded by a video of Jon Stewart introducing the song on The Jon Stewart Show. After the song, lead singer Wayne Coyne usually inflates an enormous balloon, filled with confetti or smaller balloons, until it bursts onto the crowd.

In pop culture, "She Don't Use Jelly" is played by the band Crucifictorius in season three, episode seven of Friday Night Lights. Ben Folds Five covered the song for the compilation album Lounge-A-Palooza in 1997. Their version was also included on a 2005 expanded reissue of their 1997 album Whatever and Ever Amen, as well as the 2018 box set "Brick" The Songs of Ben Folds 1994-2012.

Track listings

US CD single
 "She Don't Use Jelly" – 3:41
 "Translucent Egg" – 3:45
 "Turn It On" (bluegrass version) – 6:12
 "★★★★★★★ (Plastic Jesus)" (porch version) – 1:42

US cassette single and UK 7-inch single
 "She Don't Use Jelly" – 3:40
 "Turn It On" (bluegrass version) – 6:12

UK CD1 and Australian CD single
 "She Don't Use Jelly" – 3:40
 "Translucent Egg" – 3:45
 "Turn It On" (bluegrass version) – 6:12

UK CD2
 "She Don't Use Jelly" – 3:40
 "The Process" (live in Austin, Texas, August 1993) – 6:02
 "Moth in the Incubator" (live in Austin, Texas, August 1993) – 4:12

Charts

Release History

References

1993 singles
1993 songs
The Flaming Lips songs
Songs written by Michael Ivins
Songs written by Steven Drozd
Songs written by Wayne Coyne
Warner Records singles